Karol Kučera (born 4 March 1974) is a retired ATP professional male tennis player from Slovakia. He achieved a career-high singles ranking of World No. 6 in September 1998, reaching the semi-finals of the Australian Open the same year.

In 2020, Kučera was elected an MP of the National Council of Slovakia representing the Ordinary People and Independent Personalities movement along with a fellow former tennis player Ján Krošlák and Romana Tabak.

Tennis career
Kučera turned professional in 1992. He was a member of the Czechoslovakian Galea Cup teams in 1991 and 1992 and the 1992 European championship squad. In 1993 he qualified for his first Grand Slam at Roland Garros.

In 1995 when Kučera won his first ATP title in Rosmalen. In 1996 he played in the Summer Olympics in Atlanta where he lost to eventual gold medalist Andre Agassi.

A year later he won his second ATP title in Ostrava defeating Magnus Norman. He was runner-up in two other tournaments in Nottingham on grass to Greg Rusedski and Stuttgart Outdoor to Álex Corretja on clay.

Kučera's best year was in 1998, where he finished the year in the top 10, ranked World No. 8, which qualified him in the ATP Tour World Championship in Hannover. During the year Kučera won 2 titles in Sydney defeating Tim Henman and New Haven defeating Goran Ivanišević.

He reached another two finals, losing to Gustavo Kuerten in Stuttgart Outdoor and to World No. 1 Pete Sampras in Vienna. Overall in 1998, Kučera compiled a career high 53 match victories and earning $1,402,557.

Kučera achieved his best Grand Slam result in 1998 reaching the semi-finals of Australian Open where on his way he defeated Sergi Bruguera, Daniel Vacek, Daniel Nestor, Richard Fromberg and defending champion Pete Sampras in the quarter-finals, losing to eventual champion Petr Korda in 4 sets. Later the same year he reached the quarterfinals of the US Open.

In 1999, Kučera won his fifth ATP title in Basel defeating Tim Henman in the final. After 1999, Kučera struggled with form due to a right wrist and arm injury.

After some injury plagued years, Kučera found some form again in 2003 when he finished in the top 50 for the first time since 1999. During the year he won his sixth and final tour title in Copenhagen defeating Olivier Rochus in the final.

Later, Kučera was one of the contributing members on the Slovakian team which reached the final of the Davis Cup in 2005, eventually losing to Croatia 2–3. He announced his retirement after the final.

Style of play
Miloslav Mečíř known as the "Big Cat" was Kučera's coach from 1997 to 2001. Kučera was nicknamed the "Little Cat" because of his deceptive style of play and his fluid movement around the court resembling his coach. 

Kučera was also coached for a time by Novak Djokovic's coach Marian Vajda.

Career finals

Singles 12 (6–6)

Doubles: 4 (0–4)

Singles performance timeline

1This event was held in Stockholm through 1994, Essen in 1995, and Stuttgart from 1996 through 2001.

Top 10 wins

References

External links
 
 
 
 
 
 

1974 births
Hopman Cup competitors
Living people
People from Monte Carlo
Slovak male tennis players
Slovak expatriates in Monaco
Tennis players from Bratislava
Olympic tennis players of Slovakia
Tennis players at the 1996 Summer Olympics
Tennis players at the 2000 Summer Olympics
Tennis players at the 2004 Summer Olympics
Czechoslovak male tennis players
Members of the National Council (Slovakia) 2020-present